Yves Ällig (born 11 September 1944) is a Swiss figure skater. He competed in the pairs event at the 1964 Winter Olympics.

References

1944 births
Living people
Swiss male pair skaters
Olympic figure skaters of Switzerland
Figure skaters at the 1964 Winter Olympics
Place of birth missing (living people)